Viljo "Vili" Vesterinen (26 March 1907 in Terijoki – 18 May 1961 in Helsinki) was a Finnish accordionist and composer.

Vesterinen studied piano and cello in Vyborg Music Institute, but as an accordionist he was self-taught. Vesterinen mainly played in different bands and theatres early in his career. Vesterinen made his first recordings in 1929. The most popular recording of Vesterinen is Säkkijärven polkka in 1939. Even though it is not Vesterinen's own song, his version of the song is the most popular among people. Other popular songs are Metsäkukkia (1931), Hilpeä hanuri (1936) and Valssi menneiltä ajoilta (1939). Vesterinen made a total of 130 recordings during his career. Due to heavy use of alcohol and cigarettes his health deteriorated and later in his career he could not play accordion in same frequence as before.

Vesterinen also starred some movies. The movie Säkkijärven polkka (1955) tells about Vesterinen's life.

References

External links
 List of recordings of Vesterinen
 List of compositions of Vesterinen

1907 births
1961 deaths
People from Zelenogorsk, Saint Petersburg
People from Viipuri Province (Grand Duchy of Finland)
Finnish accordionists
Finnish male composers
Finnish military personnel of World War II
20th-century accordionists
20th-century male musicians
20th-century Finnish composers